Helene Adler was a German Jewish educator, writer, and poet.

Biography
Helene Adler was born in Frankfurt in 1849, in the same house in which Ludwig Börne was born, and which was the property of her father, a minor officer of the Frankfurt Jewish community. She attended the Philanthropin until 1865, and graduated from the Wiesbaden Women's College in 1867. For fifteen years she was a teacher in the school of the Waisenschule des israelitischen Frauenvereins in her native city.

Adler gave up teaching in 1882 due to her declining health, and thereafter devoted herself entirely to literature. She published that year her first collection of poetry, Beim Kuckuck. In the following years she published poems and pedagogical essays in various newspapers and journals.

She was a proponent of pacifism during the First World War.

Selected works

References
 

1849 births
1923 deaths
19th-century German poets
20th-century German poets
Writers from Frankfurt
German women essayists
Jewish German writers
Jewish educators
Jewish poets
Jewish women writers
19th-century educational theorists
Women educational theorists
German educational theorists
20th-century German women